Vanamõisa may refer to several places in Estonia:

Vanamõisa, Kose Parish, village in Kose Parish, Harju County
Vanamõisa, Saue Parish, village in Saue Parish, Harju County
Vanamõisa, Hiiu County, village in Hiiumaa Parish, Hiiu County
Vanamõisa, Jõgeva County, village in Jõgeva Parish, Jõgeva County
Vanamõisa, Lääne-Viru County, village in Haljala Parish, Lääne-Viru County
Vanamõisa, Pärnu County, village in Lääneranna Parish, Pärnu County
Vanamõisa, Põlva County, village in Põlva Parish, Põlva County
Vanamõisa, Muhu Parish, village in Muhu Parish, Saare County
Vanamõisa, Saaremaa Parish, village in Saaremaa Parish, Saare County
Vanamõisa, Valga County, village in Tõrva Parish, Valga County
Vanamõisa, Viljandi County, village in Viljandi Parish, Viljandi County
Vanamõisa, Võru County, village in Rõuge Parish, Võru County

Valgu-Vanamõisa (known as Vanamõisa before 2017), village in Märjamaa Parish, Rapla County
Vigala-Vanamõisa (known as Vanamõisa before 2017), village in Märjamaa Parish, Rapla County